Texas's 8th congressional district of the United States House of Representatives includes parts of Montgomery County, Walker County, Harris County, Polk County, and all of San Jacinto County. It includes much of the northern outlying areas of metro Houston, including Conroe, Magnolia, and most of Lake Livingston. The current Representative from the 8th district is Morgan Luttrell and has been since 2023.

History of Texas' 8th district
Texas received an eighth congressional district through reapportionment in 1881 as a result of population growth reflected in the 1880 Census and in 1883, James Francis Miller, a Democrat, was elected its first representative. From 1882-1892 the district was located in South Central Texas between Houston and San Antonio and was represented by Democrats. After 1893, the district was located in North Texas and was represented by a Republican representative from Fort Worth and then a Democrat from Weatherford. After the redistricting of 1902, the district shifted to Southeast Texas and the area outside of Houston and was represented by Congressmen from Huntsville, Hempstead and Richmond. From 1910-1959, the 8th district comprised all of Harris County and the city of Houston.

In 1958, part of southern Harris County became the 22nd district. The 8th and 22nd districts were separated by a boundary consisting roughly of what is now U.S. 290, the western and southern portions of Loop 610, and the portion of Buffalo Bayou east of downtown Houston including the Houston Ship Channel. Everything north of this boundary remained in the 8th.

The district was redrawn mid-decade in 1966 after the Supreme Court ruled in Wesberry v. Sanders two years earlier that congressional district populations had to be equal or close to equal in population. As a result, Houston was split between the 7th, 8th, 9th and 22nd districts. For the next 17 years, the 8th was anchored by northern Houston.

By the 1970s, the 8th district was beginning to move away from its traditional Democratic roots, and in 1980 it elected a Republican congressman, Jack Fields, over liberal seven-term incumbent Bob Eckhardt. After the 1980 Census, the 8th district was pushed further north to include conservative areas of northern Harris County (such as Fields' home in Humble) as well as the wealthier portions of Montgomery County, The 8th district's borders changed drastically in the 1990s round of redistricting, which was orchestrated by the Democratic-controlled state legislature as well as then-Congressman Martin Frost, the senior Democrat in the congressional delegation. The new 8th district was designed to pack in as many Republicans as possible and was described by some critics as the "dumbbell district" because of its strange shape. The western half of the district contained parts of Waller, Austin, and Washington counties, as well as much of Brazos County, which is home to the conservative bastion Texas A&M University. The eastern half of the district took in nearly all of now-heavily Republican Montgomery County, as well as Republican areas in northern Harris County. The two halves were joined together by a narrow tendril in Waller County. Fields continued to represent the district until his retirement in 1996, when he was succeeded by fellow Republican Kevin Brady.

The 8th district was made somewhat more compact after the 2000 census, taking in nearly all of Montgomery County and most of northern Harris County. However, it changed dramatically during the 2003 redistricting plan engineered by then-House Majority Leader Tom DeLay, a Republican from Texas's 22nd district. DeLay wanted to dislodge 4-term Democratic Congressman Jim Turner from the neighboring 2nd district, who represented a district located in East Texas that was predominantly rural and had begun moving away from its Democratic roots (Bush received 63% of the vote there in 2000). Brady's 8th district lost most of its share of Houston, instead absorbing nearly all of the southern portion of the old 2nd district. Although geographically the new 8th was more Turner's district than Brady's, half its population came from Brady's base in Montgomery County, which has as many people as the rest of the district combined. The new 8th district was so heavily Republican (Bush would have carried it in 2000 with 69% of the vote) that Turner declined to run for reelection. Brady has been reelected from this district four times with only nominal opposition. In 2020, Brady fended off a primary challenge and won re-election against Democrat Elizabeth Hernandez and Libertarian Chris Duncan with 72.5% of the vote.

Due to redistricting in 2012, Texas's 8th district lost its entire eastern half, with Orange, Newton, Jasper, Tyler, Hardin, Polk, and Liberty counties being removed from the district. Counties added include all of Trinity, Houston, Grimes, Madison, and the southern half of Leon County.

in 2022, Kevin Brady, who eventually rose to become Chairman of the influential House Ways and Means Committee (where he notably shepherded the Tax Cuts and Jobs Act of 2017), announced his retirement from Congress. At the same time, Brady's hometown of The Woodlands was redrawn into the 2nd District of neighboring Republican Dan Crenshaw, while the 8th was redrawn to now cover all areas of Montgomery County north of The Woodlands along with southern portions of Walker County, all of San Jacinto and Polk counties (including Lake Livingston) and a western section of Harris County that includes a sizable number of middle-class Hispanics with neighborhoods that vary in composure from heavily Republican to heavily Democratic (including some that were central to the Democrats' pickup of the traditionally Republican 7th District in the 2018 elections). The new district remains heavily Republican, even though the Harris County portion is considered more competitive than the overwhelmingly Republican remainder of the district.

On March 1, 2022 the Texas Republican primary was held. Morgan Luttrell won the primary with 52.2% of the vote against 11 different challengers. Christian Collins held 2nd at 22.2% and Jonathan Hullihan in 3rd with 12.6%.  Luttrell defeated Democrat nominee Laura Jones on November 8, 2022.

List of members representing the district 
District borders are periodically redrawn and some district residences may no longer be in the 8th district.

Election results from presidential races

Election results

Historical district boundaries

See also
List of United States congressional districts

References

08
Harris County, Texas